Fernando Muñoz García (born 30 October 1967), known as Nando, is a Spanish retired footballer who played mostly as a central defender (right-footed, he was also utilized on the flank).

During a 15-year professional career he appeared in 306 La Liga games, having represented four clubs, most notably Barcelona and Real Madrid.

Club career
Born in Seville, Nando started his career with hometown's Sevilla FC, his first game being on 22 February 1987 in a 1–0 home win against Athletic Bilbao (90 minutes played). He left in the 1990 summer to join FC Barcelona – with the Andalusians having an option to rebuy – where he won the European Cup in 1992 and two La Liga titles in two seasons; at his new team, he reunited with former Sevilla defensive mate Ricardo Serna.

Subsequently, Nando returned to Sevilla, but was immediately bought by Barça archrivals Real Madrid, where he would spend three-and-a-half seasons with irregular playing time – 46 matches in his first two years combined, three in the following – before moving to RCD Espanyol in January 1996. In the other Catalonia side he would play until the end of the 2000–01 campaign, scoring his only goals as a professional in the process.

Nando retired in 2001, aged almost 34.

International career
Nando earned eight caps for the Spain national team, all while at Barcelona. His debut came on 12 September 1990 in a 3–0 friendly win over Brazil, in Gijón.

Honours
Barcelona
La Liga: 1990–91, 1991–92
European Cup: 1991–92
UEFA Cup Winners' Cup: Runner-up 1990–91

Real Madrid
La Liga: 1994–95
Copa del Rey: 1992–93
Supercopa de España: 1993

Español
Copa del Rey: 1999–2000

References

External links
 
 Espanyol archives 
 
 

1967 births
Living people
Footballers from Seville
Spanish footballers
Association football defenders
La Liga players
Segunda División B players
Sevilla Atlético players
Sevilla FC players
FC Barcelona players
Real Madrid CF players
RCD Espanyol footballers
Spain youth international footballers
Spain under-21 international footballers
Spain international footballers